Yeung Sum (born 22 November 1947 in Guangzhou) is a Hong Kong politician and academic. He served several terms as a Legislative Councillor and was the second chairman of the Democratic Party (DP), a pro-democracy political party in Hong Kong. He is a lecturer at the University of Hong Kong.

Biography
Yeung Sum obtained his undergraduate degree at the University of Hong Kong. He was a residential member in St. John's College and became the president of its student association from 1972–1973. He gained his master's degree at the University of York in Britain before returning to earn his doctorate from the University of Hong Kong. Yeung Sum has taught at the University of Hong Kong since 1979 and has been a lecturer in the Department of Social Work and Social Administration since 1985.

When the issue of Hong Kong sovereignty after 1997 came up in 1983, Yeung and some graduates from the University of Hong Kong founded Meeting Point, the first political organisation supporting Hong Kong's return to Chinese sovereignty. During the drafting of the Hong Kong Basic Law, he pushed for a democratic model for Hong Kong after 1997. He was the second chairman of the group from 1988 to 1989. He also formed the Joint Committee on the Promotion of Democratic Government with liberal-minded drafters Martin Lee and Szeto Wah and became the spokesman of the committee. he was a committee member of the Hong Kong Alliance in Support of Patriotic Democratic Movements in China during the Tiananmen protests of 1989 and remained critical of the Chinese government after the bloody crackdown.

In 1990, he became the founding vice-chairman of the United Democrats of Hong Kong, the first pro-democracy party and filled candidates in the District Board elections and Urban and Regional Councils elections. In the first Legislative Council direct election, he was directly elected through the Island West constituency. He became the vice-chairman of the Democratic Party when the United Democrats and Meeting Point merged in 1994.

Yeung remained legislator until the legislature was dissolved in 1997 when Hong Kong was handed over to China. He was re-elected to the Legislative Council in the 1998 LegCo election and remained in the LegCo until he stepped down as the second place on the party's candidate list in 2008 behind Kam Nai-wai.

Yeung represented the Mainstreamers, a relatively moderate faction, within the democratic camp, and discontent with him within the Democrats led to splits within the party. When Yeung took the chairmanship from Martin Lee in 2002, legislator Albert Chan quit the party, and the following year a number of "Young Turks" left the party to join The Frontier. In 2004, taking responsibility for recent election failures, he announced that he would not seek another term as party chairman. He has remained on the party's central committee and executive committees occasionally.

On 28 February 2020, Yeung was arrested over his involvement in a march on 31 August 2019 which was part of
protests sparked by the extradition bill, and had been classified by police
as illegal assembly. A few hours later, he was released on bail, as were the other arrestees Jimmy Lai
and Lee Cheuk-yan. The cases were scheduled to be heard at Eastern Law Court on 5 May 2020. On 18 April, Yeung was again arrested as one of 15 Hong Kong high-profile democracy figures, on suspicion of organizing, publicizing or taking part in several unauthorized assemblies between August and October 2019 in the course of the anti-extradition bill protests. Following protocol, the police statement did not disclose the names of the accused.

On 10 June 2022, Sum, along the two other pro-democracy figures, had his Silver Bauhinia Star honour removed, and his Justice of the Peace appointment was revoked by the government due to his jail sentences related to anti extradition-bill protests.

See also
 Politics of Hong Kong
 List of graduates of University of Hong Kong

References

External links
 Biography of Yeung Sum at the LegCo
 Biography of Yeung Sum at the Democratic Party

1947 births
Living people
Alumni of the University of Hong Kong
Alumni of St. John's College, University of Hong Kong
Hong Kong social scientists
Academic staff of the University of Hong Kong
Leaders of political parties
Politicians from Guangzhou
Alumni of the University of York
Democratic Party (Hong Kong) politicians
United Democrats of Hong Kong politicians
Meeting Point politicians
Scientists from Guangdong
HK LegCo Members 1991–1995
HK LegCo Members 1995–1997
HK LegCo Members 1998–2000
HK LegCo Members 2000–2004
HK LegCo Members 2004–2008
Members of the Election Committee of Hong Kong, 2012–2017
Members of the Election Committee of Hong Kong, 2017–2021
Recipients of the Silver Bauhinia Star